South Select is an American women's soccer team, founded in 2007. The team is a member of the Women's Premier Soccer League, the third tier of women's soccer in the United States and Canada. The team plays in the South Division of the Big Sky Conference.

The team plays its home games in the stadium on the South Campus of San Jacinto College in Houston, Texas. The club's colors are white.

Players

Current roster

Notable former players

Year-by-year

Honors

Competition history

Coaches
  David DeVerteuil 2008–present

Stadia
 Stadium at San Jacinto College, Houston, Texas 2008–present

Average attendance

External links
 WPSL South Select page

Women's Premier Soccer League teams
Women's soccer clubs in the United States
Soccer clubs in Texas
2007 establishments in Texas
Women's sports in Texas